Dying for a Heart is the second album by Krystal Meyers, released September 19, 2006.

This album is edgier than her first album in musical style and in lyrics. This is most clearly seen in the song "The Situation", which openly opposes premarital sex. The album peaked at No. 19 on Heatseekers.

The song, "Together", was featured on the NBC pre-show for Heroes: Villains.

Track listing

Singles

"Collide" was the album's lead single released in early 2006
"The Beauty of Grace" was the album's second single
"Hallelujah" was the album's third single
"Together" was the final single from the album

Release history

Personnel
Krystal Meyers – vocals, songwriting
Ian Eskelin – production, executive production, songwriting
Andrew Bojanic and Elizabeth Hooper ("The Wizardz of Oz") – production, musical production, songwriting
Jordyn Conner – executive production
Mike Krompass – music engineering, additional guitar production
Barry Weeks – vocal engineering, songwriting
Randy Cooke – drums
Dan Shike – mastering
Reid Shippen – mixing

References

2006 albums
Krystal Meyers albums
Essential Records (Christian) albums